Irpacaenis is a genus of small squaregilled mayflies in the family Caenidae. There are at least three described species in Irpacaenis.

Species
These three species belong to the genus Irpacaenis:
 Irpacaenis coolooli Suter, 1999
 Irpacaenis deani Suter, 1999
 Irpacaenis kaapi Suter, 1999

References

Further reading

 
 

Mayflies
Articles created by Qbugbot